Douglas Haig, 1st Earl Haig (1861–1928) was a British soldier and senior commander during World War I.

Douglas Haig may also refer to:
 Douglas Haig (actor) (1920–2011), American actor
 Club Atlético Douglas Haig, an Argentine football club founded in 1918

See also
Douglas Hague (1926–2015), British economist

Haig, Douglas